Yoo Hyun-ji (born 16 July 1984) is a South Korean handball player for Wonderful Samcheok and the South Korean Republic national team.

References

External Links

1984 births
Living people
South Korean female handball players
Handball players at the 2016 Summer Olympics
Olympic handball players of South Korea
Handball players at the 2014 Asian Games
Handball players at the 2018 Asian Games
Asian Games gold medalists for South Korea
Asian Games medalists in handball
Medalists at the 2014 Asian Games
Medalists at the 2018 Asian Games